Ashtabula Township is one of the twenty-seven townships of Ashtabula County, Ohio, United States. As of the 2010 census the population was 20,941.

Geography
Located in the northern part of the county along Lake Erie, it borders the following townships:
Kingsville Township - east
Plymouth Township - south
Saybrook Township - west

The Canadian province of Ontario lies across Lake Erie to the north.

Most of the city of Ashtabula is located in western Ashtabula Township, and the census-designated place of Edgewood is located in the township's southeast.

Name and history
It is the only Ashtabula Township statewide.

The first white settler in the township was one Matthew Hubbard, who arrived in Ashtabula County from Connecticut in 1804.

Government
The township is governed by a three-member board of trustees, who are elected in November of odd-numbered years to a four-year term beginning on the following January 1. Two are elected in the year after the presidential election and one is elected in the year before it. There is also an elected township fiscal officer, who serves a four-year term beginning on April 1 of the year after the election, which is held in November of the year before the presidential election. Vacancies in the fiscal officership or on the board of trustees are filled by the remaining trustees.  Currently, the board is composed of chairman Stephen McClure and members Sam Bucci and Joseph Pete, Sr.

References

External links
Township website
County website

Townships in Ashtabula County, Ohio
Urban townships in Ohio
Populated places established in 1804
Townships in Ohio